Standfussiana is a genus of moths of the family Noctuidae.

Species
 Standfussiana dalmata (Staudinger, 1901)
 Standfussiana defessa (Lederer, 1858)
 Standfussiana insulicola (Turati, 1919)
 Standfussiana lucernea (Linnaeus, 1758)
 Standfussiana nictymera (Boisduval, [1837])
 Standfussiana sturanyi (Rebel, 1906)
 Standfussiana wiskotti (Standfuss, 1888)

References
Natural History Museum Lepidoptera genus database
Standfussiana at funet

Noctuinae
Noctuoidea genera